The 1977 Green Bay Packers season was their 59th season overall and their 57th season in the National Football League. The team finished with a 4–10 record under coach Bart Starr, earning them a fourth-place finish in the NFC Central division. The Packers struggled with injuries and continued to be among the worst teams in the NFL, posting a horrendous 4-10 record. During the season, quarterbacks Lynn Dickey and David Whitehurst combined to throw 21 interceptions while just connecting on six touchdown passes. They only scored 134 points, second-worst
in the league to the 2-12 Tampa Bay Buccaneers (103).

Offseason

NFL draft 

 Yellow indicates a future Pro Bowl selection

Roster

Regular season

Schedule 

Monday (November 21)
Note: Intra-division opponents are in bold text.

Season summary

Week 1: at New Orleans Saints 
Television network: CBS
Announcers: Tim Ryan, Nick Buoniconti
Williard Harrell's 75-yard punt return and Lynn Dickey's 15-yard touchdown pass to Ken Payne helped Green Bay to a 24-0 that turned out to be the difference in their opener win. New Orleans' Chuck Muncie had touchdown runs of two and three yards and Archie Manning threw a 59-yard touchdown pass to Henry Childs in a futile rally. Saints coach Hank Stram said "I guess you can say we slept through the first half. You just can't play 30 minutes and expect to win."

Week 3: at Minnesota Vikings

Standings

Awards and records

References 
 Sportsencyclopedia.com

Green Bay Packers seasons
Green Bay Packers
Green